Núcleo de Estudos em Ética e Desconstrução or NEED  was founded in 2002 by Paulo Cesar Duque-Estrada, Associate Vice-President for Academic Affairs – Graduate Programs and Research – and Professor of the Philosophy Department of the Pontifical Catholic University of Rio de Janeiro and a group of diverse researchers from various academic backgrounds.

The group is dedicated to the thought of the French philosopher Jacques Derrida and has published three books: 
Às Margens- a propósito de Derrida (2002)
Desconstrução e Ética- Ecos de Jacques Derrida (2004)
Espectros de Derrida (2008)

External links

Official Website : NEED

Nucleo de Estudos em Etica e Desconstrucao, NEED